Lights Out is the fifth studio album by American singer-songwriter Ingrid Michaelson, released on April 15, 2014 through Cabin 24 Records under exclusive license to Mom + Pop Music. It debuted at number 5 on the Billboard 200 chart, selling 37,000 copies in its first week. The lead single from the album, "Girls Chase Boys", was released on February 4, 2014. The second single from the album, "Afterlife", was released on October 2, 2014. The third single, "Time Machine", was released on February 19, 2015.

A deluxe edition with an alternate cover and a bonus disc was released on November 11, 2014.

Critical reception

Lights Out received positive reviews from music critics upon its release. At Metacritic, which assigns a normalized rating out of 100 to reviews from mainstream critics, the album has received an average score of 74, based on 5 reviews, indicating "generally positive reviews" feedback. AllMusic's Matt Collar rated the album four stars out of five, stating how the release shows "Michaelson has captured that sound of love." At The Oakland Press, Gary Graff rated the album three stars out of four, writing how the release is "filled with emotional heavy lifting", and the LP features "Michaelson's use of choral arrangements throughout is just one of the elements that remind us of what a clever artist she is while also pushing her in fresh directions."

Commercial performance
The album entered the Billboard 200 chart at number 5, with first-week sales of 37,000 copies. It also debuted at number 2 on Top Rock Albums. It has sold 160,000 copies as of August 2016.

Track listing

Personnel

 Ian Axel – piano (13), vocals (13)
 Jeremy Bose – keyboards, programming 
 Leslia Broussard – clapping, background vocals
 C.J. Camarieri – french horn, trumpet
 Adam Christgau – percussion
 Cason Cooley – electric guitar, percussion, piano, programming, synthesizer, background vocals
 Trent Dabbs – acoustic guitar (9,10), vocals (9,10)
 Eric Darken – percussion, programming
 Nathan Dugger – electric guitar
 Cara Fox – cello
 Lynn Grossman – clapping, stomping
 Katie Herzig – celeste, synthesizer, background vocals
 Felicia J. Hudson – clapping, background vocals
 Nadim Issa – Wurlitzer
 Elliot Jacobson – drums, percussion, stomping
 Mat Kearney – acoustic guitar, programming, synthesizer, vocals (8)
 Chad King – vocals (13)
 Jacquire King – clapping, stomping
 Chris Kuffner – bass guitar, clapping, e-bow, acoustic guitar, electric guitar, tenor guitar, harmonium, omnichord, programming, slide guitar, stomping, synthesizer, synthesizer bass, background vocals
 Jesse Kuffner – cello, violin
 Greg Laswell – vocals (3)
 Brian Lee – bass guitar, background vocals, whistle
 Stephen Leiweke – electric guitar
 Tony Lucido – bass guitar
 Jeremy Lutito – drums
 Mick Lynch – acoustic guitar, background vocals
 Saul Simon MacWilliams – clapping, organ, piano, stomping, synthesizer, trumpet, background vocals, Wurlitzer
 Kevin May – background vocals
 Ingrid Michaelson – clapping, omnichord, piano, stomping, lead vocals, background vocals
 Allie Moss – clapping, background vocals
 The Orphanage String Quartet – strings
 Adam Pallin – programming, keyboards, background vocals
 Wendy Parr – background vocals
 Bess Rogers – clapping, acoustic guitar, electric guitar, stomping, background vocals
 Dan Romer – bass guitar
 Gabe Scott – acoustic guitar, Hammer dulcimer, lap steel guitar
 F. Reid Shippen – programming
 Storyman – vocals (4)
 Hannah Winkler – clapping, background vocals

Chart performance

Year-end charts

References

External links

2014 albums
Ingrid Michaelson albums
Vertigo Records albums